Otoyol 53, abbreviated as O-53, also known as Ceyhan-İskenderun Otoyolu, is a toll motorway in Mediterranean Region, Turkey, connecting the Adana-Şanlıurfa Motorway O-52 with İskenderun. The motorway is part of international routes as European route E91 and Asian Highway 84.

The O-53 starts from Ceyhan in Adana Province at the junction of O-52, runs southward to İskenderun South bypassing the city in the east.

See also
 List of highways in Turkey

References

 Turkish General Directorate of Highways. Turkey road map.
List of exits on O-53

53
Transport in Adana Province
Transport in Hatay Province
Toll roads in Turkey